The ARIA Albums Chart ranks the best-performing albums and extended plays in Australia. Its data, published by the Australian Recording Industry Association, is based collectively on each album and EP's weekly physical and digital sales. In 2013, thirty-six albums claimed the top spot, including Michael Bublé's Christmas and Pink's The Truth About Love, both of which started their peak positions in 2011 and 2012, respectively. Sixteen acts achieved their first number-one album in Australia: Bruno Mars, Flume, Of Monsters and Men, Foals, Nick Cave and the Bad Seeds, Birds of Tokyo, Daft Punk, Queens of the Stone Age, Kanye West, Harrison Craig, Karnivool, RÜFÜS, Boy & Bear, Lorde, Dami Im and Taylor Henderson.

Michael Bublé had two number-one albums during the year for To Be Loved and Christmas. Bublé's To Be Loved and Pink's The Truth About Love tied for the longest-running number-one album of 2013, both spending five weeks atop the ARIA Albums Chart. Bruno Mars' Unorthodox Jukebox and Bublé's Christmas topped the chart for three consecutive weeks. Justin Timberlake's The 20/20 Experience, Daft Punk's Random Access Memories, Harrison Craig's More Than a Dream and Eminem's The Marshall Mathers LP 2 each spent two weeks at number one.

Chart history

Number-one artists

See also
2013 in music
List of number-one singles of 2013 (Australia)
List of Top 25 albums for 2013 in Australia

References

2013
Australia Albums
2013 in Australian music